Robert Daniel Ghindeanu (born 23 September 1980 in Țuglui, Dolj) is a Romanian former professional footballer who played as a right-back.

External links
 
 

1980 births
Living people
Romanian footballers
Association football fullbacks
Liga I players
FC Progresul București players
CS Mioveni players
CS Pandurii Târgu Jiu players
CS Otopeni players
People from Dolj County